Râul Mic may refer to:

 Râul Mic (Cugir), Romania
 Râul Mic (Cibin), Romania